Heiki Vilep (born 27 March 1960 in Tartu) is an Estonian poet, children's writer and writer.

Books 
 Under unconscious – 2001
 Hello! – 2002
 The Monsters of the Closet Door – 2003
 My song – 2003
 Flying Apple Tree – 2003
 The Sounds of Silence – 2004
 Jan's Adventures in Shadowland – 2004
 I want to be – 2005
 Liisu – 2005
 The Monsters of the Closet Door 2 – 2006
 Two of me – 2006
 Liisu 2 – 2006
 Pink Princess – 2006
 Liisu 3 – 2007
 Roof's ride – 2007
 Pillow fight – 2007
 Goblin, Tell-tale and Screeper – 2008
 Horlok and the key of Primeval Gate – 2008
 Clock's Cuckoo – 2008
 Sandman's stories – 2008
 Bearded joke – 2009
 Enchanted city – 2009
 The Monsters of the Closet Door 3 – 2009
 Fear – novel, 2010
 50 stories and poems to small friends – 2010
 Fear – novel, in russian 2010
 Liisu and the mad house buffet - 2011
 Lost Christmas - in russian 2011
 Over a bottomless abyss - 2011
 Fate Games - novel, 2011
 Loggerhead tree - 2011
 Jõks and five wonderful days - 2012
 Kaappipeikot (The Monsters of the Closet Door, Finnish, Petteri Aarnos, 2013) Kaappipeikot Ovat Täällä Taas (The Monsters of the Closet Door 2, Finnish, Petteri Aarnos, 2013) Kaappipeikot Planeetta X:llä (The Monsters of the Closet Door 3, Finnish, Petteri Aarnos, 2013) Nukku-Matin Höpöjutut (Drowsy Mati's flams, Finnish, Tea Saarinen, 2013) Noiduttu Kaupunki (Enchanted city, Finnish, Petteri Aarnos, 2013) Tahtoisin Olla (I want to be, Finnish, Gea Karja, Jaana Palanterä, 2013) Hei! (Hello!, Finnish, Gea Karja, Jaana Palanterä, 2013) Hiljaisuuden Äänet (The Sounds of Silence, Finnish, Petteri Aarnos, 2013) Vaaleanpunainen Prinsessa (Pink Princess, Finnish, Petteri Aarnos, 2013) Janin Seikkailut Varjomaassa (Jan's Adventures in Shadowland, Finnish, Petteri Aarnos, 2013) Lucy (In English, 2015) Lucy In A Sand Hole (In English, 2015) Lucy Invents A Candle Blower (In English, 2015) Lucy and Madhouse Canteen (In English, 2015) The Monsters of The Closet Door (In English, 2015) Sandman's Stories (In English, 2015) The Sounds of Silence (In English, 2015) Sandman's New Stories – 2015 Villiam - 2015''

See also

References

External links
Heiki Vilep homepage (archieved version)

1960 births
Living people
Writers from Tartu
Estonian children's writers
Estonian male poets
21st-century Estonian poets